Frederick II of Sicily may refer to:

 Frederick II, Holy Roman Emperor (1194–1250), who technically was Frederick I of Sicily but the regnal number II was used of him throughout his various realms
 Frederick III of Sicily (1272–1337), who technically was Frederick II but used Frederick III

See also
Frederick II (disambiguation)